McVicar is a British drama film released in 1980 by The Who Films, Ltd., starring Roger Daltrey of the Who playing the 1960s armed robber and later writer John McVicar.

The film was directed by Tom Clegg, and was based on the non-fiction book McVicar by Himself, which McVicar wrote to describe several months of his experiences in prison. Bill Curbishley and Roy Baird acted as producers, and the film received a nomination in 1981 for Best Picture at MystFest, the International Mystery Film Festival of Cattolica.

Plot synopsis
The film is set in two halves, the first in Durham prison and the second half while McVicar is on the run in London. The first half of the film focuses on relations between the prison officers and inmates and also McVicar's plotting and eventual prison escape.

The latter half of the film is set in London after McVicar has escaped from Durham. Here he re-establishes relationships with his wife and young son and he eventually decides to try to escape from his life of crime by trying to fund a new life in Canada.

Eventually, however, McVicar is forced to fund his family's relocation plan by returning to crime. Soon the Metropolitan Police are hard on his heels and he is eventually recaptured when one of his colleagues in the crime world informs the police officer in charge of McVicar's recapture of his whereabouts.

McVicar is returned to prison and his sentence is increased, but during this time he studies for a BSc in sociology and he is eventually released.

Cast

Roger Daltrey as John McVicar
Adam Faith as Walter Probyn
Cheryl Campbell as Sheila McVicar
Billy Murray as Joey David
Georgina Hale as Kate
Steven Berkoff as Ronnie Harrison
Brian Hall as Terry Stokes
Peter Jonfield as Bobby Harris
Matthew Scurfield as Streaky Jeffries
Leonard Gregory as Jimmy Collins
Joe Turner as Panda
Jeremy Blake as Ronnie Johnson
Anthony Trent as Tate
Terence Stuart as Sid
Harry Fielder as Harry 'Aitch'
Ian Hendry as Hitchens
Malcolm Tierney as Frank	 
James Marcus as Sewell
Tony Haygarth as Rabies
Anthony May as Billy
Michael Feast as Cody
Richard Simpson as Douglas
Malcolm Terris as Principal Officer
Ricky Parkinson as Russell McVicar

Soundtrack
The film's soundtrack, a Roger Daltrey solo album, was released as McVicar and featured contributions by the other three extant members of The Who, Pete Townshend, John Entwistle and Kenney Jones, along with other musicians. The music was conducted by Jeff Wayne. The songs are:

"Bitter and Twisted", written by Steve Swindells
"Just a Dream Away", written by Russ Ballard
"White City Lights", written by Billy Nicholls and Jon Lind
"Free Me", written by Russ Ballard
"My Time Is Gonna Come", written by Russ Ballard
"Waiting for a Friend", written by Billy Nicholls
"Without Your Love", written by Billy Nicholls
"McVicar", written by Billy Nicholls

Charts

See also
 Cinema of the United Kingdom

References

External links
 
 
 

1980 films
1980s biographical drama films
1980 crime drama films
British biographical drama films
British independent films
British prison drama films
Crown International Pictures films
Films based on non-fiction books
Films set in County Durham
Films set in London
Films shot at Pinewood Studios
The Who
Films directed by Tom Clegg (director)
1980s prison drama films
1980s English-language films
1980s British films